Emil Bildstein (17 May 1931 – 23 January 2021) was a German water polo player. He competed at the 1952 Summer Olympics, the 1956 Summer Olympics and the 1960 Summer Olympics.

See also
 Germany men's Olympic water polo team records and statistics
 List of men's Olympic water polo tournament goalkeepers

References

External links
 

1931 births
2021 deaths
Water polo goalkeepers
German male water polo players
Olympic water polo players of Germany
Olympic water polo players of the United Team of Germany
Water polo players at the 1952 Summer Olympics
Water polo players at the 1956 Summer Olympics
Water polo players at the 1960 Summer Olympics
Sportspeople from Munich